Joseph "Bill" Wilson is a Guyanese professional football manager.

Career
Since 2000 until 2002 he coached the Guyana national football team.

References

Year of birth missing (living people)
Living people
Guyanese football managers
Guyana national football team managers
Place of birth missing (living people)